Patrick Ruthven, 1st Earl of Forth and 1st Earl of Brentford (c. 1573 – 2 February 1651) was a Scottish nobleman, general, and diplomat.

Service to the Crown of Sweden 
Patrick Ruthven was a descendant of Sir William Ruthven, 1st Lord Ruthven in a collateral line, and a grandson of Lord Innermeath. A lifelong professional soldier, Ruthven earned his reputation in the service of the King of Sweden, which he entered about 1609 and left 1637. He had been forced into exile to retain his family name which had been outlawed in Scotland by act of Parliament in 1600. As a negotiator he was very useful to Gustavus Adolphus because of his ability to "drink immeasurably and preserve his understanding to the last", and he also won fame on the field of battle.  By 1621 Ruthven served as colonel for the Småland infantry regiment with which he campaigned in Livonia (Latvia). He took as his second in command Alexander Leslie, later promoted field marshal and one of Ruthven's opponents in the English Civil War. Ruthven was one of four Scottish colonels to be knighted by Gustav II Adolf of Sweden in 1627, the others being Alexander Leslie, David Drummond and John Hepburn.

His service in the Thirty Years' War was impressive. He became governor of Ulm in 1632 and was promoted to major-general the same year. The following year Ruthven campaigned along the Danube where he captured a number of Bavarian Horse outside Erbach which earned him his promotion to lieutenant general. He thereafter campaigned as second in command to the Swedish field marshal, Johan Banér, campaigning along the Rhine throughout 1634 and 1635. He was given a large share of the credit for the routing of the Saxon general, Wolfgang Baudissin at Dömitz, where some 2500 of the prisoners he took were pressed into the Swedish army. However, all was not well between Ruthven and Banér. The latter accused him of negligence at Halle in 1636. Ruthven thereafter returned to Scotland on a recruiting trip, but having made up his mind to quit Swedish service. Although Ruthven remained on the Swedish pay-roll for another year he travelled home via France where he claimed he was offered a field-marshal's baton by Louis XIII. Although he never served in this capacity, the rank appears on his English certificate of elevation to the nobility.

Service to the king of Great Britain 
With the outbreak of the Bishops' Wars in Scotland in 1639, Ruthven offered his services to Charles I. He brought with him his two nephews, Major General John Ruthven and Colonel Frances Ruthven, both veterans of Swedish service. These joined a cohort of other Royalist Scots, including former colleague, Lieutenant General James King. During the 1639 campaign, he declined command of the Royalists in Scotland as he was not to be granted 'absolute authority' over them, instead being expected to defer to the nobility. His decision was wise and Edinburgh Castle soon easily fell to his former understudy, Alexander Leslie. After the Truce of Berwick was agreed, Ruthven was allowed to garrison the castle for the king and he defended it throughout 1640, becoming desperately ill after his provisions ran out. He and his English troops were allowed to leave the castle by negotiation. For his services he was raised to the Peerage of Scotland as Lord Ruthven of Ettrick in 1639 during the Bishops War and later created Earl of Forth in 1642.

When the English Civil War broke out that year, Ruthven joined Charles at Shrewsbury with some 29 other Scottish veteran officers and after Henrietta Maria's intervention with the king. Ruthven commanded the Royalist forces at the Battle of Edgehill after the nominated commander, Robert Bertie, Earl of Lindsey, stepped down in a dispute over whether to arrange the army following the Dutch or the Swedish style. In the end the Swedish brigade system was chosen and Ruthven assumed command. Following the battle, Ruthven was appointed general-in-chief of the Royalist army.

The Earl compelled the Earl of Essex to surrender Lostwithiel, and was wounded at both the first and second battles of Newbury. While some claim Ruthven's faculties had begun to decay, Ruthven had lost favour of his military inferior Prince Rupert, whose arrogance he detested. They fell out en route to face down the Army of the Solemn league and Covenant commanded by his friend Alexander Leslie. Believing Rupert inept, Ruthven returned to Oxford leaving Rupert in command. The prince lost the battle to Alexander Leslie and his English parliamentary allies on 2 July 1644. Ruthven thereafter served as Chamberlain to the Prince of Wales, having finally given up field service.

Ruthven still maintained correspondence with Axel Oxenstierna, the regent and chancellor of Sweden. He visited Sweden on a mission for Charles II to raise military support for the planned Montrosian expedition to Scotland. Using the social capital he had built up in Sweden over the years, Ruthven entered into negotiations with Queen Christina and managed to raise an officer cadre, money and guns for delivery to Royalists in Scotland and Ireland. These were squandered as Charles II withdrew his support for the Montrosians, effectively offering him up as a sacrificial lamb to the Covenanters in Scotland in return for their support. Dejected, Ruthven and King turned their back on the Royalist cause. Although it is often claimed that Ruthven died at Dundee on 2 February 1651 near the house of his relative, Colonel Patrick More, in fact he died at Buxtehude just outside Hamburg. He had been on a journey which took him from Kalmar to Copenhagen and Bremen with Sir William Swann and 2 companions. In Buxtehude, Swann and More took Ruthven's body to a nearby monastery after which it was returned to Scotland for burial. Apparently, he was entombed near Dundee at Monifieth Parish Church in the Durham of Grange family's burying-aisle. This family were noted Royalists who also helped the Marquis of Montrose on his way to Sweden. The church was razed and rebuilt in 1812. It is unknown what became of Ruthven's grave, though a plaque commemorating him is found in the present day church.

Family 
Ruthven was married to Jane Henderson and to Clara Berner. He had at least two sons: Alexander served as an officer in the Swedish army but he died before his father. Patrick Ruthven's daughter Jane corresponded with the English Parliament from Stockholm in 1652. She became involved in inheritance disputes with Patrick's third wife, Clara Berner, who did not die until 1679. Ruthven made his will on 9 May 1649 and in it left all his Swedish lands to his son Alexander's widow, Anna Erasma Klencke and Patrick's son by the same marriage (Jane Henderson), who was also called Patrick. These lands were Brevik (Jönköping Län). To his surviving wife, Clara Berner and their son Patrick, he donated Ljungbyholm in Kalmar Län (Sweden) and Sackendorf (Mecklenburg). His other goods in Scotland he left to Clara Berner. Clara and his daughter-in-law Anna Klence fought protracted disputes over the Småland lands, even until 1669, and these involved royal intervention. The executors to his will were General James King (taking care of the Swedish side) and Jakob Pringle of Huitbank (of the Scottish side).

Other Information 
According to contemporary sources, Ruthven's behavior was consistent with that of a severe alcoholic, and at times he was called "Rothwein" (red wine). At the time of his resignation as commander in chief in 1644 he is said to have shown clear signs of chronic alcohol damage, and that may have been a factor contributing to his replacement by Prince Rupert of the Rhine.

References

 Ruthven Correspondence: Letters and Papers of Patrick Ruthven, Earl of Forth and Brentford, and of His Family: A. D. 1615 – A. D. 1662. With an Appendix of Papers Relating to Sir John Urry, edited from the Original Mss., by the Rev. William Dunn Macray (Google eBook)
 National Records of Scotland, GD 246/box 26/bundle 5/19. Letters and Papers of Lt. General Sir Patrick Ruthven. Lady Jane Ruthven, Stockholm, 15 January 1652 quoted in Steve Murdoch, Network North: Scottish Kin, Commercial and Covert Associations in Northern Europe, 1603–1646 Leiden, 2006, p. 102.
 Swedish Riksarkiv, de la Gardiesamlingen, E1501, Patrick More to Magnus de la Gardie, Buxtehude, 26 February 1652.
 J Barratt, Cavalier Generals: King Charles I and His Commanders during the English Civil War 1642–46, Pen & Sword Military Books, 2004.
 Alexia Grosjean, An Unofficial Alliance: Scotland and Sweden, 1569–1654, Leiden, 2003.
 J. Malcolm, The Parish of Monifieth in Ancient and Modern Times Edinburgh, 1910.
 Steve Murdoch and Alexia Grosjean, Alexander Leslie and the Scottish Generals of the Thirty Years' War, 1618–1648, Pickering & Chatto, 2014.
 P R. Newman, The Atlas of English Civil Wars, Routledge, 2005.

|-

Brentford, Patrick Ruthven, 1st Earl of
Year of birth uncertain
Earls in the Peerage of Scotland
Peers of Scotland created by Charles I
1st Earl of Brentford
Peers of England created by Charles I
Scottish generals
Scottish mercenaries
Scottish diplomats
Swedish diplomats
Royalist military personnel of the English Civil War
17th-century Scottish people
17th-century soldiers
Scottish expatriates in Sweden
Scottish people of the Thirty Years' War
Patrick